Tom and Jerry in House Trap is an action game released in 2000 for the PlayStation. The game was developed by Warthog Games and was published by NewKidCo in North America. In Europe, the game was published by Ubi Soft and NewKidCo. Success published a Japanese version of the game in 2002.

Reception

References

External links
 Tom and Jerry in House Trap at GameSpot

2000 video games
Video games based on Tom and Jerry
PlayStation (console) games
PlayStation (console)-only games
Success (company) games
Mattel games
Ubisoft games
Video games developed in the United Kingdom
Cartoon Network video games
NewKidCo games
Multiplayer and single-player video games